Vanguard Youth is the youth organization of the Patriotic Party in Turkey. It was launched on 17 April 1994, during the Workers' Party period. Vanguard Youth worked as a left-wing nationalist, legal organization in the Turkey.

Purpose and methods 
Vatan Youth considers that its primary duty is to unite the youth around the great values ​​of the country, labor and humanity by leading the youth movement in Turkey ideologically, strategically, politically and practically. Vatan Youth cadres and members, in addition to participating in party work, mainly carry out activities within university societies and youth mass organizations. "Full independent and truly democratic Turkey!" With its slogan, it aims to spread its political program among the largest youth masses, in universities and high schools. He argues that a people's power that favors independence, enlightenment and labor can be established through democratic revolutions through the process of incessant revolutions. Turkey's 200-year-old struggle for democratic revolution (Mithat Pasha, Namık Kemal, Mustafa Kemal, Şefik Hüsnü, 27 Mayısçı Kuşak, 1968 Movement) and the revolutionary accumulation of humanity (French Revolution, Russian Revolutions and anti-imperialist revolutions in oppressed nations). In this context, it directs its members to mass organization activities in order to be able to unite with the largest youth masses and to fight together with the youth bases and organizations of different patriotic political subjects. Pioneering Youth defends the right of everyone to engage in free politics on campuses. Against the obstruction of the right to education, it puts forward the slogan "Anyone with a student identity goes to school". Pioneering Youth advocates a line that organizes conferences and protests and, in their own words, "organizes the struggle". It declares that the struggle for "Independent Turkey", "Enlightenment" and "Independence, Revolution, Socialism" in universities is the leading youth organization.

References

Youth wings of political parties in Turkey
Youth organizations established in 1994